John Claiborne (January 26, 1778October 9, 1808) was a son of Thomas Claiborne (1749–1812) and brother of Thomas Claiborne (1780–1856). He was a Representative from Virginia; born in Brunswick County, Virginia in 1778; pursued academic studies; graduated from the medical department of the University of Pennsylvania in Philadelphia in 1798 and practiced; elected as a Democratic-Republican to the Ninth and Tenth Congresses and served from March 4, 1805, until his death in Brunswick County, Virginia, on October 9, 1808; interment in the family burying ground of Parson Jarratt, Dinwiddie, Virginia.

See also
List of United States Congress members who died in office (1790–1899)

References

1778 births
1808 deaths
People from Brunswick County, Virginia
Claiborne family
American people of English descent
Democratic-Republican Party members of the United States House of Representatives
American physicians
Perelman School of Medicine at the University of Pennsylvania alumni